Agonopterix farsensis is a moth in the family Depressariidae. It was described by Hans-Joachim Hannemann in 1958. It is found in Iran.

References

Moths described in 1958
Agonopterix
Moths of Asia